Cryptophasa catharia is a moth in the family Xyloryctidae. It was described by Turner in 1917. It is found in Australia, where it has been recorded from Western Australia.

References

Cryptophasa
Moths described in 1917